Japan national bandy team is competing for Japan in the international bandy tournaments. Japan Bandy Federation was established in April 2011 and the national team made its world championship debut in 2012. After having competed every time since then, at the 2023 World Championship the team will not participate.

Tournament participation

World Championships

2012 – 13th place (2nd in Group C)
2013 – 13th place (7th in Division B)
2014 – 12th place (4th in Division B)
2015 – 13th place (6th in Division B)
2016 – 13th place (5th in Division B)
2017 – 12th place (4th in Division B)
2018 – 10th place (2nd in Division B)
2019 – 12th place (4th in Division B)

References

External links 
Japan Bandy Federation Official Homepage

Bandy in Japan
National bandy teams
Bandy